Brachylepadidae is an extinct family of barnacles in the order Brachylepadomorpha, the sole family in the order. There are about 7 genera and more than 20 described species in Brachylepadidae.

Genera
These genera belong to the family Brachylepadidae:
 Brachylepas Woodward, 1901
 Epibrachylepas Gale, 2014
 Fallaxlepas Gale, 2020
 Faxelepas Gale, 2014
 Parabrachylepas Gale, 2014
 Pedupycnolepas Gale, 2014
 Pycnolepas Withers, 1914

References

Barnacles
Prehistoric crustacean families